The Ibera seedeater (Sporophila iberaensis) is a species of bird in the family Thraupidae, formerly included within the family of American sparrows (Emberizidae).

It is found in the Iberá Wetlands. It was described in 2016.

Taxonomy 
The specific epithet iberaensis refers to the species main distribution throughout the Iberá Wetlands in the province of Corrientes, Argentina.

Description

References

Ibera seedeater
Birds of Argentina
Iberá Wetlands